The following is an incomplete list of Ottawa Football Clubs head coaches in the Canadian Football League (CFL) and preceding Interprovincial Rugby Football Union (IRFU), Quebec Rugby Football Union (QRFU), and Ontario Rugby Football Union (ORFU). The current incarnation of the club, Ottawa Redblacks, are a professional Canadian football team based in Ottawa, Ontario, and are members of the East Division of the CFL.

As defined in the 2021 CFL Guide & Record Book, for historical record purposes and by the current Ottawa Redblacks' request, the Ottawa Football Clubs are considered to be a single entity since 1876 with two periods of inactivity (1997–2001 and 2006–2013). Consequently, this list includes figures from the Ottawa Football Club (1876–1898), Ottawa Rough Riders (1899–1925, 1931–1996), Ottawa Senators (1926–1930), Ottawa Renegades (2002–2005), and Ottawa Redblacks (2014–present). 

The club was founded as the Ottawa Football Club in 1876 and was a founding member of the Ontario Rugby Football Union in 1883 and of the Interprovincial Rugby Football Union in 1907. The current Ottawa Redblacks head coach is Bob Dyce.

Key

Head coaches
Note: Statistics are current through the end of the 2021 CFL season.

Notes
 A running total of the number of coaches of Ottawa Football Clubs since 1904 (and therefore this is an incomplete list). Any coach who has two or more separate terms as head coach is only counted once.
 Each year is linked to an article about that particular CFL season.

References

Lists of Canadian Football League head coaches by team
Ottawa Redblacks lists